Bianca Odinakachukwu Olivia Odumegwu-Ojukwu (born 5 August 1968) is a Nigerian politician, diplomat, lawyer, and businesswoman. She is the widow of former Biafra president  Chukuemeka Odumegwu Ojukwu.

Bianca Odumegwu-Ojukwu is a multiple international pageant titleholder, having won Most Beautiful Girl in Nigeria 1988 and Miss Africa, and is best known as the first African to win Miss Intercontinental. Formerly a presidential advisor, she was the country's ambassador to Ghana and became Nigeria's Ambassador to Spain in 2012.

Biography

Early life and education 
The sixth child of former Anambra governor Christian Onoh and his wife Carol, a college principal, Odumegwu-Ojukwu spent most of her childhood in rural Ngwo with her siblings Lilian, Josephine, Nuzo, Gabriel, Stella, Christian and Josef. She attended Ackworth School, Pontefract, St Andrews College, Cambridge, and Cambridge Tutorial College where she obtained her A-levels. She soon began a combined honours degree in Politics, Economics and Law at the University of Buckingham, but transferred to the University of Nigeria, Nsukka after her father, a lawyer by profession, insisted she concentrated solely on Law and join the family business. Following graduation, Odumegwu-Ojukwu attended the Nigerian Law School which eventually led to her call to the bar.

Early career
After Law School, Odumegwu-Ojukwu briefly practised the profession before quitting to divide her time between her home, her cosmetics business Bianca Blend and her interior decorating outfit Mirabella. Despite her reservations regarding modelling, Odumegwu-Ojukwu fronted print commercials for her brand. She also established the non-government organisation Hope House Trust, centred towards rehabilitating juvenile offenders in Enugu.

Pageantry
In December 1988, Odumegwu-Ojukwu, who had previously emerged winner at Miss Martini, was crowned Most Beautiful Girl in Nigeria, but reigned through most of 1989. She also won the Miss Africa 1989 pageant held in Gambia before representing her country at both Miss World in Hong Kong and Miss Universe in Mexico. She achieved greater success when she won Miss Intercontinental that same year, and was named Miss Congeniality at the now defunct Miss Charm International in Russia where she was also a semi-finalist.

Diplomacy 
In 2011, Odumegwu-Ojukwu was appointed Senior Special Assistant on Diaspora Affairs by President Goodluck Jonathan; in 2012 she became Nigeria's Ambassador to Ghana and later Ambassador to the Kingdom Of Spain. In 2016, Odumegwu-Ojukwu received a master's degree in International Relations and Diplomacy from Alfonso X el Sabio University in Spain. She is now Nigeria's permanent representative to the United Nations World Tourism Organization. Her sister, Lilian Onoh was Nigeria’s Ambassador to the Republic of Namibia.

Controversy 
In 1989, halfway through her reign as MBGN, the press revealed Odumegwu-Ojukwu's secret relationship with the former Biafran Head Of State Chukwuemeka Odumegwu Ojukwu, a political associate of her father's, over thirty years her senior. Their controversial romance was a national talking point in the early 1990s. The immense pressure of being under the public eye became increasingly unbearable, causing her to resign as Miss Intercontinental as her main concern was completing her education as a law student. In 1994, having finally obtained her degree, she married the former Biafran president in a lavish wedding ceremony held in Abuja.

In 2012, following the death of her husband, his will, which left most of his assets to her, generated a great deal of controversy and disaffection among several family members. Odumegwu-Ojukwu appealed to her critics to allow Ikemba Odumegwu-Ojukwu to "rest in peace", describing him as a man of honour and integrity whose legacy should not be obscured by rancour over inheritance issues and stating that the will was drafted in 2005, registered and placed in the custody of the State Probate Registry with the legal witnesses and executors, who were present at the time it was prepared, still living.

On 17 March 2022, during the inaugural ceremony of governor Chukwuma Soludo, Odumegwu-Ojukwu delivered what has now been widely dubbed a ‘valedictory slap’ to a visibly inebriated Ebelechukwu Obiano, the outgoing first lady of Anambra State, who had physically attacked her at the state function.

Personal life
Odumegwu-Ojukwu was married to Ikemba Odumegwu-Ojukwu until his death in 2011; the couple had three children together. Of her marriage, she admits that while she was happy to have found her husband, she would not encourage her daughter to make a similar choice of marital engagement. Odumegwu-Ojukwu holds many traditional titles in her native land as well as the highest chieftaincy title conferred on women in her region.

Awards 
Odumegwu-Ojukwu was honoured with the Certificate of Merit by El Mundo Diplomatico for her efforts towards providing effective platforms for constructive engagement between Nigeria and Spain, and was voted Africa's Outstanding Ambassador by Dutch magazine The Voice in 2014. She was also honored with the "Ambassador of Excellence" Award by the Government of Anambra State, Nigeria at its Silver Jubilee commemoration in 2016. She is a member of the Board of Trustees of the All Progressives Grand Alliance, the Political Party that was founded by her late husband Chukwuemeka Odumegwu-Ojukwu and which has maintained political power in Anambra State for over a decade. Her bid to represent her senatorial district in 2018 was stalled as a result of irregularities which occurred during her party's primary elections.
She is presently the secretary of the Truth, Justice and Peace Commission set up in 2022 to investigate the root causes of violence, insecurity and separatist agitations in South Eastern Nigeria.

References

1968 births
Living people
People from Enugu State
Ambassadors of Nigeria to Spain
High Commissioners of Nigeria to Ghana
Nigerian women ambassadors
Nigerian women diplomats
Igbo beauty pageant contestants
Nigerian beauty pageant winners
Miss Universe 1989 contestants
Miss World 1989 delegates
Most Beautiful Girl in Nigeria winners
Nigerian women lawyers
University of Nigeria alumni
Alfonso X El Sabio University alumni
Nigerian diplomats
Most Beautiful Girl in Nigeria contestants